β-Hydride elimination is a reaction in which an alkyl group bonded to a metal centre is converted into the corresponding metal-bonded hydride and an alkene. The alkyl must have hydrogens on the β-carbon. For instance butyl groups can undergo this reaction but methyl groups cannot. The metal complex must have an empty (or vacant) site cis to the alkyl group for this reaction to occur.  Moreover, for facile cleavage of the C–H bond, a d electron pair is needed for donation into the σ* orbital of the C–H bond.  Thus, d0 metals alkyls are generally more stable to β-hydride elimination than d2 and higher metal alkyls and may form isolable agostic complexes, even if an empty coordination site is available.

The β-hydride elimination can either be a vital step in a reaction or an unproductive side reaction. The Shell higher olefin process relies on β-hydride elimination to produce α-olefins which are used to  produce detergents. Illustrative of a sometimes undesirable β-hydride elimination, β-hydride elimination in Ziegler–Natta polymerization results in polymers of decreased molecular weight. In the case of nickel- and palladium-catalyzed couplings of aryl halides with alkyl Grignard reagents, the β-hydride elimination can lower the yield. The production of branched polymers from ethylene relies on chain walking, a key step of which is β-hydride elimination.

In some cases, β-hydride elimination is the first in a series of steps. For instance in the synthesis of RuHCl(CO)(PPh3)3 from ruthenium trichloride, triphenylphosphine and 2-methoxyethanol, an intermediate alkoxide complex undergoes a β-hydride elimination to form the hydride ligand and the pi-bonded aldehyde which then is later converted into the carbonyl (carbon monoxide) ligand.

Avoiding β-hydride elimination
Several strategies exist for avoiding β-hydride elimination. The most common strategy is to employ alkyl ligands that do not have any hydrogen atoms at the β position. Common substituents include methyl and neopentyl. β-Hydride elimination is also inhibited when the reaction would produce a strained alkene. This situation is illustrated by the stability of metal complexes containing norbornyl ligands, where the β-hydride elimination product would violate Bredt's rule.

Bulky alkyl ligands, such as tert-butyl or trimethylsilyl, may prohibit the hydrogen atom from approaching a coplanar configuration with respect to the metal, and the α and β atoms. If the metal center does not have empty coordination sites, for example by the complex already having an 18-electron configuration, β-hydride elimination is not possible as well.

In some cases, the coligands can impose geometries that inhibit β-hydride elimination. For the above example, the unwanted β-hydride elimination is prevented by using a diphosphine where the two phosphorus atoms are fixed apart in space. One way of doing this is to use a trans spanning ligand such as Xantphos. As these metal complexes traditionally form square planar geometries, no vacant site cis to the alkyl group can be formed. Hence the β-hydride elimination is prevented. (See trans-spanning ligand.)

References

Organometallic chemistry